HMS Bideford was a member of the Gibraltar Group of 24-gun sixth rates. After commissioning she spent her career West Indies, Morocco and Portugal on trade protection duties. She was rebuilt at Chatham in 1727. After her rebuild she served in Home Waters, North America and the Mediterranean on trade protection. She foundered off Flamborough Head in 1736.

Bideford was the second named vessel since it was used for a 24-gun sixth rate launched by Barret of Harwich on 25 October 1695 and wrecked on Point Baque on 12 November 1699.

Construction
She was ordered on 9 October 1711 from Deptford Dockyard to be built under the guidance of Joseph Allin, Master Shipwright of Deptford. She was launched on 14 March 1712. She was completed for sea on 2 April 1712.

Commissioned Service
She was commissioned in 1712 under the command of Commander Robert Harward, RN (promoted to captain in January 1713) for 'owling' then went to Jamaica in 1714/15. Captain William Rowley, RN was in command in June 1716 and was off Sale, Morocco during 1717/18. She underwent a refit at Deptford during March/April 1719 at a cost of Captain Beaumont Waldron, RN for service in the Channel. She was refitted at Deptford from March to July 1720 at a cost of 1,164.6.6d. Recommissioned in March 1719 under the command of Captain Edward Gregory, RN she sailed with Vice-Admiral Sir James Mighell squadron to Vigo. In 1720 she was patrolling  the English Channel then moved to Ireland in 1721/23. She was surveyed on 20 March 1726 and docked at Deptford on 8 February 1727 for rebuilding.

Rebuild at Deptford 1727
She was dismantled at Deptford in preparation for rebuilding as a 374 tom 20-gun sixth rate. Her rebuild commenced in February 1727 with her launching on 2 October 1727. The tonnage calculation would be 37145/94 tons. The gun armament as established in 1713 would be twenty 6-pounder 19 hundredweight (cwt) guns mounted on wooden trucks. She was completed for sea on 1 December 1727 at a cost of £6,886.12.4d plus £488.18.10d including fitting.

Commissioned Service after Rebuild
She was commissioned in October 1727 under the command of Captain Coville Mayne, RN for service in Virginia. She returned home and paid off in January 1713. She recommissioned in January 1713 under Captain Curtis Barnett, RN for service in the Mediterranean during 1731 thru 1733. She returned to Home Waters for service in the English Channel in 1734. 1735 saw a change in command to Captain Matthew Consett, RN for service in the English Channel and the North Sea.

Disposition
HMS Bideford foundered through a leak off Flamborough Head on 18 March 1736.

Notes

Citations

References
 Winfield 2009, British Warships in the Age of Sail (1603 – 1714), by Rif Winfield, published by Seaforth Publishing, England © 2009, EPUB , Chapter 6, The Sixth Rates, Vessels acquired from 2 May 1660, Gibraltar Group, Bideford
 Winfield 2007, British Warships in the Age of Sail (1714 – 1792), by Rif Winfield, published by Seaforth Publishing, England © 2007, EPUB , Chapter 6, Sixth Rates, Sixth Rates of 20 or 24 guns, Vessels in Service at 1 August 1714, Gibraltar Group, Bideford
 Colledge, Ships of the Royal Navy, by J.J. Colledge, revised and updated by Lt Cdr Ben Warlow and Steve Bush, published by Seaforth Publishing, Barnsley, Great Britain, © 2020, EPUB , (EPUB), Section B (Bideford)

 

1710s ships
Corvettes of the Royal Navy
Ships built in Portsmouth
Naval ships of the United Kingdom